Auguste Moïse Daumain (born 31 July 1877; date of death unknown) was a French racing cyclist who competed in the late 19th century and early 20th century. He participated in Cycling at the 1900 Summer Olympics in Paris and won the bronze medal in the men's 25 kilometre race. In the men's sprint, he finished third in the second heat and third in the fourth heat in the quarterfinals.

In the 1904 Tour de France, he finished sixth at the general classification.

References

External links
 
 
 

1877 births
French male cyclists
Olympic bronze medalists for France
Olympic cyclists of France
Cyclists at the 1900 Summer Olympics
Year of death missing
Place of death missing
Olympic medalists in cycling
Sportspeople from Loir-et-Cher
Medalists at the 1900 Summer Olympics
Cyclists from Centre-Val de Loire